John Dutton may refer to:
 John Dutton (politician) (1594–1657), English MP
 John Dutton (quarterback) (born 1975), Arena Football player
 John Dutton (defensive lineman) (born 1951), former National Football League defensive lineman
 John Dutton (trade unionist) (1907/8–1985), British trade union leader
 Sir John Dutton, 2nd Baronet (1684–1743), of the Dutton baronets, MP for Gloucestershire
 John Dutton, 2nd Baron Sherborne (1779–1862), a British peer

See also
 John Dutton Frost (1912–1993), British officer
 Jonathon Dutton (born 1981), actor
Dutton (disambiguation)